Blackhope Scar is a hill in the Moorfoot Hills range, part of the Southern Uplands of Scotland. It lies to the northeast of the town of Peebles and is the second highest of the Moorfoot Hills after Windlestraw Law.

A rough, boggy moorland hill, it is usually climbed from the Gladhouse Reservoir and offers fine views from its summit.

References

Marilyns of Scotland
Grahams
Donald mountains
Mountains and hills of the Scottish Borders
Mountains and hills of Midlothian